Southern Styria may refer to:

 Southern part of Styria, Austria
 Southern part of Styria, Slovenia